The North Coast Daylight Express was an Australian passenger train operated by the New South Wales Government Railways from November 1951 until February 1990.

It operated from Sydney via the North Coast line to Grafton. It commenced operating in November 1951 formed out a four-car DEB set. However mechanical issues with the set saw it replaced by locomotive hauled RUB set from May 1952.

In July 1974, it was briefly truncated to Taree but overcrowding on the connecting 620/720 railcar saw it restored to Grafton in November 1974.
 
In October 1985, the North Coast Daylight Express was converted to XPT operation and renamed the Holiday Coast XPT. It ceased operating in February 1990.

References

Named passenger trains of New South Wales
Passenger rail transport in New South Wales
Railway services introduced in 1951
Railway services discontinued in 1990
1951 establishments in Australia
1990 disestablishments in Australia
Discontinued railway services in Australia